

Numbers

Line 1 (Chiba Urban Monorail)
Line 1 (Astram Line) (Hiroshima Rapid Transit)
Line 1 (Blue Line) (Yokohama City Transportation Bureau)
Line 1 (Kūkō Line/Airport Line) (Fukuoka City Transportation Bureau)
Line 1 (Midōsuji Line) (Osaka Municipal Transportation Bureau)
Line 1 Asakusa Line (Tokyo Metropolitan Bureau of Transportation)
Line 1 Higashiyama Line (Transportation Bureau City of Nagoya)
Line 2 (Chiba Urban Monorail)
Line 2 (Hakozaki Line) (Fukuoka City Transportation Bureau)
Line 2 (Tanimachi Line) (Osaka Municipal Transportation Bureau)
Line 2 Hibiya Line (Tokyo Metro)
Line 2 Meijō Line (Transportation Bureau City of Nagoya)
Line 2 Meikō Line (Transportation Bureau City of Nagoya)
Line 3 (Blue Line) (Yokohama City Transportation Bureau)
Line 3 (Nanakuma Line) (Fukuoka City Transportation Bureau)
Line 3 (Yotsubashi Line) (Osaka Municipal Transportation Bureau)
Line 3 Ginza Line (Tokyo Metro)
Line 3 Tsurumai Line (Transportation Bureau City of Nagoya)
Line 4 (Chūō Line) (Osaka Municipal Transportation Bureau)
Line 4 (Green Line) (Yokohama City Transportation Bureau)
Line 4 Marunouchi Branch Line (Tokyo Metro)
Line 4 Marunouchi Line (Tokyo Metro)
Line 4 Meijō Line (Transportation Bureau City of Nagoya)
Line 5 (Sennichimae Line) (Osaka Municipal Transportation Bureau)
Line 5 Tōzai Line (Tokyo Metro)
Line 6 (Sakaisuji Line) (Osaka Municipal Transportation Bureau)
Line 6 Mita Line (Tokyo Metropolitan Bureau of Transportation)
Line 6 Sakuradōri Line (Transportation Bureau City of Nagoya)
Line 7 (Nagahori Tsurumi-Ryokuchi Line) (Osaka Municipal Transportation Bureau)
Line 7 Kamiiida Line (Transportation Bureau City of Nagoya)
Line 7 Namboku Line (Tokyo Metro)
Line 8 (Imazatosuji Line) (Osaka Municipal Transportation Bureau)
Line 8 Yūrakuchō Line (Tokyo Metro)
Line 9 Chiyoda Line (Tokyo Metro)
Line 10 Shinjuku Line (Tokyo Metropolitan Bureau of Transportation)
Line 11 Hanzōmon Line (Tokyo Metro)
Line 12 Ōedo Line (Tokyo Metropolitan Bureau of Transportation)
Line 13 Fukutoshin Line (Tokyo Metro)

A

Abiko Branch Line (Common name. East Japan Railway Company)
Aboshi Line (Sanyo Electric Railway)
Abukuma Express Line (AbukumaExpress)
Agatsuma Line (East Japan Railway Company)
Aichi Loop Line (Aichi Loop Line Company)
Airport Line (Fukuoka City Transportation Bureau)
Airport Line (Keihin Electric Express Railway)
Airport Line (Translated nickname. Kyushu Railway Company)
Airport Line (Nagoya Railroad)
Airport Line (Nankai Electric Railway)
Aizu Kinugawa Line (Yagan Railway)
Aizu Line (Aizu Railway)
Akabane Line (East Japan Railway Company)
Akasaki Line (Freight. Iwate Kaihatsu Railway)
Akasako Branch Line (Nagasaki Electric Tramway)
Akechi Line (Akechi Railroad)
Akita Nairiku Line (Akita Nairiku Jukan Railway)
Akita Rinkai Railway Line (Freight. Akita Rinkai Railway)
Akita Shinkansen (Nickname. East Japan Railway Company)
Akō Line (West Japan Railway Company)
Amagi Line (Amagi Railway)
Amagi Line (Nishi-Nippon Railroad)
Amanohashidate Cable Car (Common name. Tango Kairiku Kotsu)
Ao Line (Kobe Electric Railway)
Aoimori Railway Line (Aoimori Railway Company)
Aonami Line (Nickname. Nagoya Seaside Rapid Railway)
Arakawa Line (Tokyo Metropolitan Bureau of Transportation)
Arashiyama Line (Hankyu Corporation)
Arashiyama Main Line (Keifuku Electric Railroad)
Arima Line (Kobe Electric Railway)
Asa Line (Tosa Kuroshio Railway)
Asakusa Line (Tokyo Metropolitan Bureau of Transportation)
Asanogawa Line (Hokuriku Railway)
Asatō Line (Asa Kaigan Railway)
Aso Kōgen Line (Nickname. Kyushu Railway Company)
Astram Line (Nickname. Hiroshima Rapid Transit)
Aterazawa Line (East Japan Railway Company)
Atsugi Line (Freight. Sagami Railway)
Atsumi Line (Toyohashi Railroad)
Awa Muroto Seaside Line (Nickname. Shikoku Railway Company)
Azumada Main Line (Toyohashi Railroad)

B
Ban'etsu-Sai Line (East Japan Railway Company)
Ban'etsu-To Line (East Japan Railway Company)
Bantan Line (West Japan Railway Company)
Beppu Rakutenchi Cable Line (Okamoto MFG)
Bessho Line (Ueda Electric Railway)
Bisai Line (Nagoya Railroad)
Biwako Line (Nickname. West Japan Railway Company)
Blue Line (Nickname. Yokohama City Transportation Bureau)
Branch Line (Toyama Chiho Railway)

C

Cable Line (Kurobe Cable Car) (Tateyama Kurobe Kanko)
Cable Line (Tateyama Cable Car) (Tateyama Kurobe Kanko)
Cable Line (Hakone Tozan Railway)
Cable Line (Keifuku Electric Railroad)
Cable Line (Keihan Electric Railway)
Cable Line (Nankai Electric Railway)
Cable Line (Nose Electric Railway)
Chiba Line (Keisei Electric Railway)
Seibu Chichibu Line (Seibu Railway) 
Chichibu Main Line (Chichibu Railway)
Chidori Line (Freight. Kanagawa Rinkai Railway)
Chihara Line (Keisei Electric Railway)
Chikkō Line (Nagoya Railroad)
Chikkō Line (Common name. Takamatsu-Kotohira Electric Railroad)
Chikuhi Line (Kyushu Railway Company)
Chikuhō Electric Railroad Line (Common name. Chikuho Electric Railroad)
Chikuhō Main Line (Kyushu Railway Company)
Chita New Line (Nagoya Railroad)
Chitose Line (Hokkaido Railway Company)
Chiyoda Line (Tokyo Metro)
Chizu Line (Chizu Express)
Chōkai Sanroku Line (Yuri Kogen Railway)
Chōshi Electric Railway Line (Choshi Electric Railway)
Chūō Line (Osaka Municipal Transportation Bureau)
Chūō Main Line (East Japan Railway Company, Central Japan Railway Company)
Chūō-Higashi Line (Common name. East Japan Railway Company)
Chūō-Nishi Line (Common name. Central Japan Railway Company)
Chūō-Sōbu Line (Common name. East Japan Railway Company)

D
 (Kagoshima City Transportation Bureau)
 (Kagoshima City Transportation Bureau)
Daishi Line (Keihin Electric Express Railway)
Daishi Line (Tobu Railway)
Daiyūzan Line (Izuhakone Railway)
Dazaifu Line (Nishi-Nippon Railroad)
Den-en-Toshi Line (Tokyo Kyuko Electric Railway)
Disney Resort Line (Maihama Resort Line)
Dōbutsuen Line (Keio Electric Railway)
Domyoji Line (Kintetsu Railway)
Dosan Line (Shikoku Railway Company)
Dragon Rail Ōfunato Line (Nickname, East Japan Railway Company)

E

Eba Line (Hiroshima Electric Railway)
Ebino-Kōgen Line (Nickname. Composed of Hisatsu Line and Kitto Line. Kyushu Railway Company)
Echigo Line (East Japan Railway Company)
Eizan Cable (Common name. Keifuku Electric Railroad)
Eizan Main Line (Eizan Electric Railway)
Ekimae Line (Common name. Tosaden Kōtsū)
Ekisan Line (Common name. Tosaden Kōtsū)
Enoshima Electric Railway Line (Enoshima Electric Railway) No official line name exists.
Enoshima Line (Odakyu Electric Railway)
Enoshima Line (Shonan Monorail)
Enshū Railway Line (Enshū Railway)
Esashi Line (Hokkaido Railway Company)
Etsumi-Hoku Line (West Japan Railway Company)
Etsumi-Nan Line (Nagaragawa Railway)

F
Flower Nagai Line (Yamagata Railway)
Fruits Line Aterazawa Line (Nickname. East Japan Railway Company)
Fuji Kyūkō Line (Common name. Fuji Kyuko)
Fujikoshi Line (Toyama Chiho Railway)
Fujisaki Line (Kumamoto Electric Railway)
Fukubu Line (Fukui Railway)
Fukuchiyama Line (West Japan Railway Company)
Fukuen Line (West Japan Railway Company)
Fukuhoku Yutaka Line (Nickname. Kyushu Railway Company)
Fukushima Rinkai Railway Main Line (Freight. Fukushima Rinkai Railway)
Fukutoshin Line (Tokyo Metro) 
Furano Line (Hokkaido Railway Company)

G

Gakkentoshi Line (Nickname. West Japan Railway Company)
Gakuentoshi Line (Nickname. Hokkaido Railway Company)
Gakunan Railway Line (Gakunan Railway) No official line name exists.
Gala-Yuzawa Line (Common name. East Japan Railway Company)
Gamagōri Line (Nagoya Railroad)
Gantoku Line (West Japan Railway Company)
Geibi Line (West Japan Railway Company)
Ginga Dream Line Kamaishi Line (Nickname. East Japan Railway Company)
Ginza Line (Tokyo Metro)
Gomen Line (Tosaden Kōtsū)
Gomen-Nahari Line (Nickname. Tosa Kuroshio Railway)
Gonō Line (East Japan Railway Company)
Gose Line (Kintetsu Railway)
Gotemba Line (Central Japan Railway Company)
Gotōji Line (Kyushu Railway Company)
Green Line (Nickname. Yokohama City Transportation Bureau) 
Guideway Bus Shidami Line (Nagoya Guideway Bus)
Gunchū Line (Iyo Railway)
Guzū Line (Common name. Tobu Railway)

H

Hachikō Line (East Japan Railway Company)
Hachinohe Line (East Japan Railway Company)
Hachinohe Rinkai Railway Line (Freight. Hachinohe Rinkai Railway)
Hachiōji Line (Kintetsu Railway)
Hagoromo Branch Line (Common name. West Japan Railway Company)
Haijima Line (Seibu Railway)
Hakata-Minami Line (West Japan Railway Company)
Hakodate Main Line (Hokkaido Railway Company)
Hakone Jukkokutōge Cable Car (Nickname. Izuhakone Railway)
Hakone Tozan Cable Car (Nickname. Hakone Tozan Railway)
Hakone Tozan Line (Common name. Hakone Tozan Railway)
Hakozaki Line (Fukuoka City Transportation Bureau)
Hakubi Line (West Japan Railway Company)
Hakushima Line (Hiroshima Electric Railway)
Hakushin Line (East Japan Railway Company)
Hamanasu Bay Line Ōminato Line (Nickname. East Japan Railway Company)
Hanasaki Line (Nickname. Hokkaido Railway Company)
Hanawa Line (East Japan Railway Company)
Hanazono Line (Iyo Railway)
Handa Line (Kinuura Rinkai Railway)
Tōkyō Monorail Haneda Line (Tokyo Monorail)
Hankai Line (Hankai Electric Tramway)
Hanshin Main Line (Hanshin Electric Railway)
Hanwa Line (West Japan Railway Company)
Hanzōmon Line (Tokyo Metro)
Haruda Line (Nickname. Kyushu Railway Company)
Hashima Line (Nagoya Railroad)
Hekinan Line (Kinuura Rinkai Railway)
Hibiya Line (Tokyo Metro)
Hidaka Main Line (Hokkaido Railway Company)
Hieizan Railway Line (Hieizan Railway)
Higashi-Hagoromo Branch Line (Common name. West Japan Railway Company)
Higashi-Narita Line (Keisei Electric Railway)
Higashiyama Line (Common name. Transportation Bureau City of Nagoya)
Higashiyama Main Line (Okayama Electric Tramway)
Hijiyama Line (Common name. Hiroshima Electric Railway)
Hikoroichi Line (Freight. Iwate Kaihatsu Railway)
Himi Line (West Japan Railway Company)
Hinkaku Line (Common name. East Japan Railway Company)
Hiromi Line (Nagoya Railroad)
Hiroshima New Transit Line 1 (Hiroshima Rapid Transit)
Hiroshima Short Distance Transit Senō Line (Skyrail Service)
Hirui Line (Freight. Seino Railway)
Hisatsu Line (Kyushu Railway Company)
Hisatsu Orange Railway Line (Hisatsu Orange Railway)
Hitahikosan Line (Kyushu Railway Company)
Hobashira Cable Line (Common name. Hobashira Cable)
Hōhi Main Line (Kyushu Railway Company)
Hōjō Line (Hojo Railway)
Hoku Line (North Line) (Freight. Akita Rinkai Railway)
Hokuhoku Line (Hokuetsu Express)
Hokuriku Main Line (West Japan Railway Company)
Hokuriku Shinkansen (East Japan Railway Company)
Hokusei Line (Sangi Railway)
Hokushin Line (Hokushin Kyuko Electric Railway(services), Kobe Rapid Railway(tracks))
Hokusō Line (Hokuso Railway)
Hommachi Line (Iyo Railway)
Hommoku Line (Freight. Kanagawa Rinkai Railway)
Hōnanchō Branch Line (Common name. Tokyo Metro)
Honshi-Bisan Line (West Japan Railway Company, Shikoku Railway Company)
Hoppō Freight Line (Common name. West Japan Railway Company)
Hōrai-Yachigashira Line (Hakodate City Transportation Bureau)
Hot Spa Line (Nickname. Yagan Railway)
Hotarujaya Branch Line (Nagasaki Electric Tramway)

I

Ibara Line (Ibara Railway)
Ibi Line (Common name. Kintetsu Railway)
Ibusuki Makurazaki Line (Kyushu Railway Company)
Ichihashi Line (Freight. Seino Railway)
Iga Line (Iga Railway)
Iida Line (Central Japan Railway Company)
Iiyama Line (East Japan Railway Company)
Iizaka Line (Fukushima Transportation)
Ikawa Line (Oigawa Railway)
Ikebukuro Line (Seibu Railway)
Ikegami Line (Tokyo Kyuko Electric Railway)
Ikoma Cable Line (Kintetsu Railway)
Ikoma Line (Kintetsu Railway)
Imazatosuji Line (Osaka Municipal Transportation Bureau)
Imazu Line (Hankyu Corporation)
Imbi Line (West Japan Railway Company)
Ina Line (Saitama New Urban Transit)
Inō Line (Tosaden Kōtsū)
Inokashira Line (Keio Electric Railway)
Inuyama Line (Nagoya Railroad)
Inuyama Monorail (Common name. Nagoya Railroad)
Ise Line (Ise Railway)
Isesaki Line (Tobu Railway)
Ishikawa Line (Hokuriku Railway)
Ishinomaki Line (East Japan Railway Company)
Ishiyama Sakamoto Line (Keihan Electric Railway)
Isumi Line (Isumi Railway)
Ita Line (Heisei Chikuho Railway)
Itami Line (Hankyu Corporation)
Itō Line (East Japan Railway Company)
Itoda Line (Heisei Chikuho Railway)
Itsukaichi Line (East Japan Railway Company)
Iwaizumi Line (East Japan Railway Company)
Iwate Galaxy Railway Line (IGR Iwate Galaxy Railway)
Izu Kyūkō Line (Izukyū Corporation)
Izumino Line (Sagami Railway)

References

List A